Global Jurist is a peer-reviewed journal of legal scholarship. It focuses on comparative law, international law, law and economics, law and development and legal anthropology. Global Jurist favors a critical non-ethnocentric approach. It publishes articles in English Spanish and French.

External links
 Official site

International law journals
Law journals
Publications established in 2001
De Gruyter academic journals